"Tart Tart" is a 1987 single by the Madchester band Happy Mondays. It was the first single to be released from their album Squirrel and G-Man Twenty Four Hour Party People Plastic Face Carnt Smile (White Out) in March 1987.

The B-side, "Little Matchstick Owen's Rap" was voiced by the sound engineer, Mike Bleach.

Inspirations
According to a commentary accompanying the film 24 Hour Party People, the first verse of "Tart Tart" is about Martin Hannett, who later produced the band's second album Bummed. The second verse is explained in Bez's Freaky Dancin (p. 198–200):

Track listing

12"

"Tart Tart" – 4:18
"Little Matchstick Owen's Rap" – 4:15

References

1987 singles
Happy Mondays songs
Song recordings produced by John Cale